Tehmasp Rustom Mogul (born 19 February 1938) is an Indian sailor. He competed in the Finn event at the 1972 Summer Olympics.

References

External links
 

1938 births
Living people
Indian male sailors (sport)
Olympic sailors of India
Sailors at the 1972 Summer Olympics – Finn
Place of birth missing (living people)